Hokey pokey is a flavour of ice cream in New Zealand, consisting of plain vanilla ice cream with small, solid lumps of honeycomb toffee. Hokey pokey is the New Zealand term for honeycomb toffee. The original recipe until around 1980 consisted of solid toffee, but in a marketing change Tip-Top decided to use small balls of honeycomb toffee instead.

It is the second-most popular ice cream flavour after vanilla in New Zealand, and a frequently cited example of Kiwiana. It is also exported to Japan, Australia and the Pacific Islands.

Origins and etymology 
The term hokey pokey has been used in reference to honeycomb toffee in New Zealand since the late 19th century. The origin of this term, in reference to honeycomb specifically, is not known with certainty, and it is not until the mid-20th century that hokey-pokey ice cream was created.

Coincidentally, "hokey pokey" was a slang term for ice cream in general in the 19th and early 20th centuries in several areas — including New York City and parts of Great Britain —  specifically for the ice cream sold by street vendors, or "hokey pokey men". The vendors, said to be mostly of Italian descent, supposedly used a sales pitch or song involving the phrase "hokey pokey", for which several origins have been suggested. One such song in use in 1930s Liverpool was "Hokey pokey penny a lump, that's the stuff to make ye jump".

The term hokey pokey likely has multiple origins. One of these is the expression "hocus-pocus", which is possibly the source of the name hokey pokey in New Zealand. As a general name for ice cream outside New Zealand, it may be a corruption of one of several Italian phrases. According to "The Encyclopedia of Food" (published 1923, New York) hokey pokey (in the U.S.) is "a term applied to mixed colors and flavors of ice cream in cake form". The Encyclopedia says the term originated from the Italian phrase oh che poco - "oh how little".  Alternative possible derivations include other similar-sounding Italian phrases: for example ecco un poco - "here is a (little) piece".

Related uses 

 Hokey Pokey (The Ice Cream Man) (1975) is a song by Richard & Linda Thompson.
 Hokey Pokey's Ice Creamery is an ice cream company in Corning, New York.
 Hokey Pokey is referenced in the Mike Leigh movie Topsy Turvy by Richard Barker as he leaves Richard D'Oyly-Carte's office on a very hot day, saying "I am going out for a little Italian hokey pokey and I care not who knows it".
 Hokey Pokey is an ice cream parlour in the Prenzlauer Berg section of Berlin, Germany.

Notes

References
 The Mavens' Word of the Day: hokey
 Tracking down the origin of hokey pokey
 Longwhitekid: An Exploration of the History of Hokey Pokey Ice Cream

Flavors of ice cream
New Zealand cuisine
New Zealand desserts